The 1994 NAIA Division II football season, as part of the 1994 college football season in the United States and the 39th season of college football sponsored by the NAIA, was the 25th season of play of the NAIA's lower division for football.

The season was played from August to November 1994 and culminated in the 1994 NAIA Division II Football National Championship, played in Portland, Oregon.

In a rematch of the 1993 final, Westminster (PA) defeated defending national champion Pacific Lutheran in the championship game, 27–7, to win their sixth NAIA national title.

Conference standings

Conference champions

Postseason

‡ ''Game played at Puyallup, Washington

See also
 1994 NCAA Division I-A football season
 1994 NCAA Division I-AA football season
 1994 NCAA Division II football season
 1994 NCAA Division III football season

References

 
NAIA Football National Championship